The Institute for Logic, Language and Computation (ILLC) is a research institute of the University of Amsterdam, in which researchers from the Faculty of Science and the Faculty of Humanities collaborate. The ILLC's central research area is the study of fundamental principles of encoding, transmission and comprehension of information. Emphasis is on natural and formal languages, but other information carriers, such as images and music, are studied as well.

Research at the ILLC is interdisciplinary, and aims at bringing together insights from various disciplines concerned with information and information processing, such as logic, mathematics, computer science, computational linguistics, cognitive science, artificial intelligence, and philosophy. It is organized in the three groups Logic & Computation (project leader: Yde Venema), Logic & Language (project leader: Robert van Rooij), and Language & Computation (project leader: Jelle Zuidema) united by the key themes Explainable and Ethical AI, Interpretable Machine Learning for Natural Language Processing, Cognitive Modelling, Logic, Games and Social Agency and Quantum Information and Computation. The ILLC is involved in several international collaborations among which we highlight the Joint Research Centre for Logic (JRC), a special collaborative partnership between Tsinghua University and the University of Amsterdam.

In addition to its research activities, the ILLC is running the Graduate Programme in Logic with a PhD programme and the MSc in Logic, an international top-ranked and interdisciplinary MSc degree in logic (MSc Logic webpage). In September 2018, the institute opened the Minor in Logic and Computation, welcoming local and international bachelor students. The programme of the Minor in Logic and Computation consists of 30 EC, chosen from a list of high-profile courses organised according to four themes: Mathematics, Philosophy, Theoretical Computer Science, and Computational Linguistics and AI.

History 

The ILLC started off in 1986 as Instituut voor Taal, Logica en Informatie (ITLI; Institute for Language, Logic and Information). In the beginning, it was an informal association of staff members from the Faculty of Mathematics and Computer Science and the Faculty of Philosophy, and was joined by computational linguists from the Faculty of Humanities in 1989.
In 1991 the institute was officially established as a University Research Institute. During 1991–1996 the programming research group of the Faculty of Mathematics and Computer Science was also part of the institute. The Applied Logic Lab from the Faculty of Social Sciences was part of the ILLC from 1996 to 2003. Other groups in computer science and cognitive science have associated themselves with the institute in 1996.

The ILLC is rooted in the Amsterdam logic research tradition dating back to the early twentieth century (including researchers such as L.E.J. Brouwer, Arend Heyting, and Evert Willem Beth). It considers Beth's Instituut voor Grondslagenonderzoek en Filosofie der Exacte Wetenschappen (founded in 1952) as its precursor.

Directors

Members 
Other notable members and past members include:

 Renate Bartsch
 Harry Buhrman
 Peter van Emde Boas
 Henkjan Honing
 Luca Incurvati
 Theo Janssen
 Dick de Jongh
 Michiel van Lambalgen
 Benedikt Löwe
 Remko Scha
 Anne Troelstra
 Jouko Väänänen
 Paul Vitányi

See also 

 Korteweg-de Vries Institute for Mathematics

 Centrum Wiskunde & Informatica

External links 
 

Research institutes in the Netherlands
Cognitive science research institutes
Computer science institutes in the Netherlands
Logic organizations
University of Amsterdam